A four-slide, also known as a multislide, multi-slide, or four-way, is a metalworking machine tool used in the high-volume manufacture of small stamped components from bar or wire stock. The press is most simply described as a horizontal stamping press that uses cams to control tools. The machine is used for progressive or transfer stamping operations.

Design
A four-slide is quite different from most other presses. The key of the machine is its moving slides that have tools attached, which strike the workpiece together or in sequence to form it. These slides are driven by four shafts that outline the machine. The shafts are connected by bevel gears so that one shaft is driven by an electric motor, and then that shaft's motion drives the other three shafts. Each shaft then has cams which drive the slides, usually of a split-type. This shafting arrangement allows the workpiece to be worked for four sides, which makes this machine extremely versatile. A hole near the center of the machine is provided to expel the completed workpiece.

Advantages and disadvantages
The greatest advantage of the four-slide machine is its ability to complete all of the operations required to form the workpiece from start to finish. Moreover, it can handle certain parts that transfer or progressive dies cannot, because it can manipulate from four axes. Due to this flexibility it reduces the cost of the finished part because it requires less machines, setups, and handling. Also, because only one machine is required, less space is required for any given workpiece. As compared to standard stamping presses the tooling is usually inexpensive, due to the simplicity of the tools. A four-slide can usually produce 20,000 to 70,000 finished parts per 16-hour shift, depending on the number of operations per part; this speed usually results in a lower cost per part.

The biggest disadvantage is its size constraints. The machine is also limited to only shearing and bending operations. Extrusion and upsetting operations are impractical because it hinders the movement of the workpiece to the next station. Drawing and stretching require too much tonnage and the mechanisms required for the operations are space prohibitive. Finally, this machine is only feasible to use on high volume parts because of the long lead time required to set up the tooling.

Materials
The material stock used in four-slides is usually limited by its formability and not the machine capabilities. Usually the forming characteristics and bending radii are the most limiting factors. The most commonly used materials are:

Low-carbon cold rolled steel
Spheroidized cold rolled spring steel
Type 300 and 400 stainless spring steels
Copper alloys
Beryllium-copper alloys

Use
Items that are commonly produced on this machine include: automotive stampings, hinges, links, clips, and razor blades.

References

Bibliography
.

External links
Video of a four-slide machine in use.

 
Industrial equipment
Machines